The International Indian Ocean Expedition (IIOE) was a large-scale multinational hydrographic survey of the Indian Ocean which took place from September 1, 1959, to December 31, 1965. It involved over 45 research vessels from 14 countries. It was sponsored by the Scientific Committee on Oceanographic Research, and later by the Intergovernmental Oceanographic Commission.

Vast amounts of data on oceanic organisms were collected. For example, specimens of Polychaetes (marine worms)  were collected from the coasts of the Indian Ocean.

See also

 National Institute of Oceanography, India

References

Exploration of the Indian Ocean
Oceanographic expeditions